Gustaf Edgren (1 April 1895 – 10 June 1954) was a Swedish screenwriter, film director and producer.

Selected filmography
 40 Skipper Street (1925)
 First Mate Karlsson's Sweethearts (1925)
 The Rivals (1926)
 The Ghost Baron (1927)
 Black Rudolf (1928)
 Artificial Svensson (1929)
 Cavaliers of the Crown (1930)
 The Red Day (1931)
 Ship Ahoy! (1931)
 Colourful Pages (1931)
 Tired Theodore (1931)
 Simon of Backabo (1934)
 Walpurgis Night (1935)
 Johan Ulfstjerna (1936)
 Russian Flu (1937)
 John Ericsson, Victor of Hampton Roads (1937)
 Styrman Karlssons flammor (1938)
 With Open Arms (1940)
 Little Napoleon (1943)
 Katrina (1943)
 Dolly Takes a Chance (1944)
 His Majesty Must Wait (1945)
 Kristin Commands (1946)
 Sunshine Follows Rain (1946)
 The Girl from the Marsh Croft (1947)
 A Swedish Tiger (1948)
 The Swedish Horseman (1949)
 Sköna Helena (1951)

References

Bibliography 
 John Sundholm. Historical Dictionary of Scandinavian Cinema. Scarecrow Press, 2012.

External links 
 

1895 births
1954 deaths
Swedish film producers
Swedish film directors
20th-century Swedish screenwriters
20th-century Swedish male writers